The 2021 Four Nations Football Tournament, alternatively known as the Mahinda Rajapaksa Cup, was an international association football  friendly tournament organised by Football Sri Lanka (FSL). It's took place from 9 to 19 November 2021 at the Colombo Racecourse in Colombo, Sri Lanka.

Venue
All matches will be held at the Racecourse Ground in Colombo, Sri Lanka.

Participants countries 
The following four teams will contest in the tournament. FIFA ranking as of 21 October 2021.

Officials

Referees
 Mohammed Ahmed Al-Shammari
 Abdulhadi Al Asmar Al Ruaile
 Kasun Lakmal Weerakkody
 Hettikamkanamge Perera
 Nivon Robesh

Assistant Referees
 Faisal Eid Al-Shammari
 Majid Hudaires Al-Shammari
 Palitha Parakkrama Hemathunga
 Iran Udayankantha
 Sanjeewa Premalal
 Pathmasiri Dias
 Mohamed Ashad

Group stage
The four teams competing against each other in the group stage in a single round-robin method. At the end of group matches, the top two teams advanced to the final and two teams were eliminated. Seychelles was first team who confirmed the final with a goalless draw in their third match against Maldives. On the other hand, both Bangladesh and Sri Lanka scored four points in three matches and their goal difference was equal but Sri Lanka advanced to the final as they scored more goals than Bangladesh.

Table

Matches

Final

Statistics

Goalscorers

References

External links
2021 Four Nations Football Tournament at Global Sports Archive

International association football competitions hosted by Sri Lanka
2021 in Sri Lanka
International association football competitions in Asia
November 2021 sports events in Asia